Giovanni Pace (18 November 1933 – 19 May 2018) was an Italian accountant and politician.

Pace was born and raised in the city of Chieti. He and  studied business and economics together at university.

Pace worked as an accountant and helped establish a branch of the Italian Social Movement in Abruzzo. From 1960 to 1975, Pace served on the Chieti municipal council as a member of the MSI. Between 1990 and 1993, Pace was city auditor. He won election to the Chamber of Deputies in 1994, but ran for reelection in 1996 under the National Alliance banner. Pace, representing House of Freedoms coalition, was narrowly elected President of Abruzzo in 2000, and held office until 2005 election.

Pace died in Chieti on 19 May 2018 at the age of 84.

References

1933 births
2018 deaths
People from Chieti
Italian Social Movement politicians
National Alliance (Italy) politicians
Deputies of Legislature XII of Italy
Deputies of Legislature XIII of Italy
Presidents of Abruzzo
Italian accountants
Italian city councillors